Minervino Murge is a town and comune, former bishopric and present Latin Catholic titular see in the administrative province of Barletta-Andria-Trani in the region of Apulia in southern Italy, lying on the western flank of the Murgia Barese mountain chain.

It assumed its present name in 1836, formerly known as just Minervino (with namesakes).

The town's economy is based mainly on agriculture and herding. The karstic geology of the area has conditioned its main crops: grapes, olives, wheat, and almonds.

Ecclesiastical History 
 Established circa 900 as Diocese of Minervino (Italian) / Minerbium (Latin), with only two municipal components : Minervino itself and Montemilone (now in the administrative province of Potenza).
 The see is documented first in a papal bulla in 1025 by Pope John XIX to archbishop Bisanzio of Bari, specifying the jurisdictions under the Metropolitan Archbishop of Bari, but the document is disputed
 Locals tradition and a list of incumbents in the episcopal palace starts the apostolic succession with Bisanzio in 1069, but he may well have been bishop of Lavello instead
 The bishopric was a suffragan of the Metropolitan of Bari no later than 1152, if not from the start, but disputed papal bullas suggest it may have been suffragan of the Archdiocese of Trani before
 Suppressed on 1818.06.27, its territory being merged into the Diocese of Andria; however in 1976, the comune Montemilone was transferred to the Diocese of Venosa.

Residential Ordinaries 
Suffragan Bishops of Minervino
First centuries unavailable or incomplete 
 Ignatius = Innazio (recorded in 1071)
 Mandus ? (in 1102)
 Johannes = Giovanni (in 1122)
 Maraldo (? - 1171/1177 deposed)
 apparently the see was vacant in 1179 as the see wasn't represented at the Third Council of the Lateran
 Leopardo (first in 1180 - till 1197)
 Riccardo, Benedictine Order (O.S.B.) (first in 1215 - after 1219)[12]
 An anonymous incumbent (in 1234)
 Pietro di Cerignola (16 March 1255 - 13 March 1256), next Bishop-elect of Roman Catholic Diocese of Canne [12]
 Biviano (first 1271 - till 1276)[12]
 Antonio di Gaeta, Dominican Order (O.P.) (1298 - ?)
 Trasmondo (in 1310)
 Giacomo (in 1321)
 Rainaldo di Provenza (1344 – 1352)
 Lorenzo (1353.11.14 – 1365)
 Leonardo Arnini (1426.08.23 – death 1433)
 Sancio (1433.01.14 – 1434), previously Bishop of Diocese of Civita (Italy) (? – 1433.01.14)
 Goffredo (1434.09.15 – death 1456)
 Giovanni Campanella, Benedictine Order (O.S.B.) (1456.04.13 – death 1478?)
 Marino Cieri (1478.10.05 – death 1491?)
 Roberto de Noya, Dominican Order (O.P.) (1492.01.23 – 1497.05.15), next Bishop of Acerra (Italy) (1497.05.15 – 1504.04.15), Bishop of Naxos (insular Greece) (1504.04.15 – death 1515)
 Marino Falconi (1497.04.17 – death 1525)
 Antonio Sassolino, Conventual Friars Minor (O.F.M. Conv.) (1525.07.21 – 1528), previously Superior general of the Conventual Franciscans
 Bernardino Fumarelli (1528.08.07 – 1529.08.16), next Bishop of Alife (Italy) (1529.08.16 – 1532.11.04), Bishop of Sulmona (Italy) (1532.11.04 – 1547.06.05), Bishop of Valva (Italy) (1532.11.04 – death 1547.06.05)
 Giovanni Francesco de Marellis (1529.08.16 – death 1536)
 Gian Vincenzo Micheli (1545.03.02 – death 1596 as centenarian), participant at the Tridentine Council (1545-1563), previously Bishop of Lavello (1539.05.30 – 1545.03.02)
 Lorenzo Monzonís Galatina, O.F.M. (1596.06.21 – 1605), next Auxiliary Bishop of Archdiocese of Valencia (Spain) (1605 – 1610.01.27), Archbishop of Lanciano (Italy) (1610.01.27 – 1617.11.20), Archbishop-Bishop of Diocese of Pozzuoli (Italy) (1617.11.20 – death 1630.02.11)
 Giacomo Antonio Caporali (1606.01.09 – 1616), consecrated the rebuilt cathedral
 Altobello Carissimi (1617.01.30 – death 1632)
 Giovanni Michele Rossi, Carmelite Order (O. Carm.) (1633.01.12 – death 1633.04.11)
 Gerolamo Maria Zambeccari, O.P. (1633.04.11 – 1635), previously Bishop of Alife (Italy) (1625.04.07 – 1633.04.11)
 Antonio Maria Pranzoni (1635.05.06 – death 1663)
 Francesco Maria Vignola (1663.09.24 – death 1700)
 Marcantonio Chenevix (1702.11.20 – death 1717.07)
 Nicola Pignatelli (1719.02.09 – death 1734.10.28)
 Fabio Troyli (1734.12.01 – 1751.02.01), next Bishop of Catanzaro (Italy) (1751.02.01 – death 1762.08.01)
 Stefano Gennaro Spani (1751.03.15 – death 1776.04)
 Pietro Silvio Di Gennaro (1776.07.15 – 1779.07.12), next Bishop of Venosa (Italy) (1779.07.12 – death 1786)
 Pietro Mancini (1792.02.27 – death 1808).

Titular see 
The diocese was nominally restored in 1968 as Latin Titular bishopric of Minervino Murge (Curiate Italian) / Minervium (Latin) / Minerbinen(sis) (Latin).

It has had the following incumbents, of the fitting Episcopal (lowest) rank :
 Ramón Torrella Cascante (1968.10.22 – 1983.04.11) as Auxiliary Bishop of Archdiocese of Barcelona (Spain) (1968.10.22 – 1970.11.06); later Roman Curia official : Vice-president of Council of the Laity (1970.11.06 – 1974.03.06), vice-president of Pontifical Commission of Justice and Peace (1970.11.06 – 1975.12.20), vice-president of Pontifical Council “Cor unum” (1971.07.22 – 1975.12.20), vice-president of Secretariat for Christian Unity (1975.12.20 – 1983.04.11), vice-president of Council of European Bishops’ Conferences (1983 – 1993), then Metropolitan Archbishop of Archdiocese of Tarragona (Spain) (1983.04.11 – retired 1997.02.20), died 2004
 Ryszard Karpiński (1985.09.28 – ...), as Auxiliary Bishop of Archdiocese of Lublin (Poland) (1985.09.28 – 2011.12.31) and on emeritate.

City sights

Former Cathedral of Mary Assumed 
 The medieval former cathedral, now Chiesa S. Maria Assunta, was built under Norman rule, but mostly rebuilt from 1519 until the consecration on 30 August 1608 by bishop Giacomo Antonio Caporali (1606.01.09 – 1616). 
 A document from 1667 specifies it has 43 ecclesiastical officials, including an archdeacon, an archpriest, a primicerius, a cantor, 10 canons, 26 other priests, a deacon and two subdeacons.

Other sights 
 The castle (14th century), later remade as a palazzo
 The Baroque church of the Immacolata Concezione
 A 15th century tower
 Not far are the Caves of Altamura.

Twin towns
  Sagliano Micca, Italy, since 2009

See also 
 List of Catholic dioceses in Italy

Sources and external links 
 Minervino-Murge.Com
 GCatholic, with Google satellite photo - former and titular see
 GCatholic, with Google satellite photo/map - former cathedral
 Bibliography - ecclesiastical history
 Ferdinando Ughelli, Italia sacra, vol. VII, second edition, Venice 1721, coll. 745-748
 Michele Garruba, Serie critica de' Sacri Pastori Baresi, Tipografia Fratelli Cannone, Bari 1844, pp. 965–966
 Giuseppe Cappelletti, Le Chiese d'Italia dalla loro origine sino ai nostri giorni, Venice 1870, vol. XXI, pp. 82–85
 Paul Fridolin Kehr, Italia Pontificia, vol. IX, Berlin 1962, p. 344
 Norbert Kamp, Kirche und Monarchie im staufischen Königreich Sizilien, vol. 2, Prosopographische Grundlegung: Bistümer und Bischöfedes Königreichs 1194 - 1266; Apulien und Kalabrien, Münich 1975, pp. 640–642
 Pius Bonifacius Gams, Series episcoporum Ecclesiae Catholicae, Leipzig 1931, pp. 897–898
 Konrad Eubel, Hierarchia Catholica Medii Aevi, vol. 1, p. 343; vol. 2, pp. XXXI, 193; vol. 3, p. 245; vol. 4, p. 243; vol. 5, p. 269; vol. 6, p. 290
 Papal Bulla 'De utiliori', in Bullarii Romani continuatio, Vol. XV, Rome 1853, pp. 56–61
 Cronotassi dei vescovi di Minervino, pp. 45–47

Hilltowns in Apulia
Castles in Italy